Jill E. Steinberg is an American lawyer who has served as the United States attorney for the Southern District of Georgia since February 2023.

Education

Steinberg received her Bachelor of Arts, summa cum laude, from the University of Georgia in 1995 and a Juris Doctor from Duke University Law School in 1998.

Career 

Steinberg began her legal career serving as an assistant district attorney for the Philadelphia District Attorney's Office from 1998 to 2001. From 2001 to 2008, she was an associate at Rogers & Hardin LLP in Atlanta, Georgia. From 2008 to 2014 and 2016 to 2021, Steinberg served as an assistant United States attorney in the United States Attorney's Office for the Northern District of Georgia. From 2014 to 2016, she worked at the United States Department of Justice in Washington, D.C., serving as an associate deputy attorney general in the Office of the Deputy Attorney General from 2015 to 2016 and as an attorney advisor in the National Security Division from 2014 to 2015. Since 2021, she has been a partner at Ballard Spahr LLP.

Nomination as U.S. attorney 

On October 19, 2022, President Joe Biden announced his intent to nominate Steinberg to be the United States attorney for the Southern District of Georgia. On November 14, 2022, her nomination was sent to the Senate. On January 3, 2023, her nomination was returned to the president under Rule XXXI, Paragraph 6 of the United States Senate. She was renominated on January 23, 2023. On February 9, 2023, her nomination was reported out of the Senate Judiciary Committee by a voice vote, with Senators Ted Cruz, Josh Hawley and Marsha Blackburn voting no on record. On February 16, 2023, the United States Senate confirmed her nomination by voice vote. She was sworn in by District Court Chief Judge James Randal Hall on February 22, 2023.

References

Year of birth missing (living people)
Place of birth missing (living people)
Living people
20th-century American women lawyers
20th-century American lawyers
21st-century American women lawyers
21st-century American lawyers
Assistant United States Attorneys
District attorneys in Pennsylvania
Duke University School of Law alumni
Georgia (U.S. state) lawyers
United States Attorneys for the Southern District of Georgia
United States Department of Justice lawyers
University of Georgia alumni